Astastus is a genus of beetles in the family Carabidae, containing the following species:

 Astastus debilis Peringuey, 1896
 Astastus quadrimaculatus Basilewsky, 1958

References

Lebiinae